Pukeuri is a settlement to the north of Oamaru in the North Otago region of New Zealand's South Island.  It is located near the coast in the Waitaki District that straddles the border of Otago and Canterbury.  

The settlement's major employer is the Alliance abattoir, which is North Otago's biggest employer.  A large fire in January 2006 came at the height of the killing season and caused significant disruptions for both workers and customers.

Pukeuri is the location of the junction of State Highways 1 and 83, and it used to be the junction of the Main South Line and Kurow Branch railways as well.  The Main South Line still runs through the town, though it no longer caters for passenger traffic.  Construction of the branch line began in 1874 and Pukeuri served as the junction until the line's closure in 1983.

A plaque next to State Highway 1 to the north of the settlement (close to the farming community of Hilderthorpe) marks the 45th parallel.

Demographics
It is part of the larger Lower Waitaki statistical area.

The unit had a population of 177 at the 2018 New Zealand census, an increase of 6 people (3.5%) since the 2013 census, and an increase of 24 people (15.7%) since the 2006 census. There were 60 households. There were 90 males and 87 females, giving a sex ratio of 1.03 males per female. The median age was 38.1 years (compared with 37.4 years nationally), with 39 people (22.0%) aged under 15 years, 33 (18.6%) aged 15 to 29, 81 (45.8%) aged 30 to 64, and 18 (10.2%) aged 65 or older.

Ethnicities were 88.1% European/Pākehā, 11.9% Māori, and 5.1% Asian (totals add to more than 100% since people could identify with multiple ethnicities).

Although some people objected to giving their religion, 54.2% had no religion, 35.6% were Christian and 1.7% had other religions.

Of those at least 15 years old, 15 (10.9%) people had a bachelor or higher degree, and 27 (19.6%) people had no formal qualifications. The median income was $36,400, compared with $31,800 nationally. The employment status of those at least 15 was that 75 (54.3%) people were employed full-time, 18 (13.0%) were part-time, and 3 (2.2%) were unemployed.

Lower Waitaki statistical area

Lower Waitaki had a population of 1,389 at the 2018 New Zealand census, an increase of 123 people (9.7%) since the 2013 census, and an increase of 342 people (32.7%) since the 2006 census. There were 501 households. There were 708 males and 681 females, giving a sex ratio of 1.04 males per female. The median age was 40.1 years (compared with 37.4 years nationally), with 309 people (22.2%) aged under 15 years, 231 (16.6%) aged 15 to 29, 636 (45.8%) aged 30 to 64, and 210 (15.1%) aged 65 or older.

Ethnicities were 89.6% European/Pākehā, 7.3% Māori, 1.1% Pacific peoples, 5.8% Asian, and 1.9% other ethnicities (totals add to more than 100% since people could identify with multiple ethnicities).

The proportion of people born overseas was 13.6%, compared with 27.1% nationally.

Although some people objected to giving their religion, 51.0% had no religion, 41.0% were Christian, 0.4% were Buddhist and 1.3% had other religions.

Of those at least 15 years old, 150 (13.9%) people had a bachelor or higher degree, and 243 (22.5%) people had no formal qualifications. The median income was $36,900, compared with $31,800 nationally. 168 people (15.6%) earned over $70,000 compared to 17.2% nationally. The employment status of those at least 15 was that 591 (54.7%) people were employed full-time, 174 (16.1%) were part-time, and 33 (3.1%) were unemployed.

References

External links 
 News article on fire at Pukeuri meatworks

Waitaki District
Populated places in Otago